In Greek mythology, Aether, Æther, Aither, or Ether ((Brightness) ) is the personification of the bright upper sky. According to Hesiod, he was the son of Erebus (Darkness) and Nyx (Night), and the brother of Hemera (Day). In Orphic cosmogony Aether was the offspring of Chronus (Time), and the brother of Chaos and Erebus.

Genealogy
According to Hesiod's Theogony, which contained the "standard" Greek genealogy of the gods, Aether was the offspring of Erebus and Nyx, and the brother of Hemera. However, other early sources give other genealogies. According to one, the union of Erebus and Nyx resulted in Aether, Eros, and Metis (rather than Aether and Hemera), while according to another, Aether and Nyx were the parents of Eros (in Hesiod, the fourth god to come into existence after Chaos, Gaia (Earth), and Tartarus). Others tell us that Uranus (Sky) (in Hesiod, the son of Gaia) was Aether's son, and that "everything came from" Aether.

In Orphic cosmogony Aether was the offspring of Chronus (Time), the first primordial deity, and the brother of Chaos and Erebus. And made from (or placed in) Aether was the cosmic egg, from which hatched Phanes/Protogonus, so Aether was sometimes said to be his father. The Orphic Argonautica gives a theogony that begins with Chaos and Chronus, and has Chronus producing Aether and Eros.

Aether also played a role in Roman genealogies of the gods. Cicero says that Aether and Dies (Day) were the parents of Caelus (Sky), and reports that according to the "so called theologians" Aether was the father of one of the "three Jupiters". According to Hyginus's (possibly confused) genealogy, Nox (Night), Dies, Erebus, and Aether were the offspring of Chaos and Caligo (Mist), and Aether and Dies were the parents of Terra (Earth), Caelus (Sky) and Mare (Sea), and Aether and Terra were the parents of:

Sources

Early
For the ancient Greeks, the word aether (unpersonified), referred to the upper atmosphere, a material element of the cosmos. For example Homer has Sleep climb:
 However, Aether (personified) figured prominently in early Greek cosmogony. In Hesiod's Theogony, Chaos was the first being after which came Gaia (Earth), Tartarus, and Eros, then from Chaos came Erebus (Darkness) and Nyx (Night), and from Erebus and Nyx came Aether and Hemera (Day):

Aether perhaps also figured in the lost epic poem the Titanomachy (late seventh century BC?). Two ancient sources report statements about Aether, which they attribute to the "author of the Titanomachy". The Homeric Parsings (from Methodius), reports that Uranus was Aether's son, while Philodemus, in his De Pietate (On Piety), reports that "everything came from Aither".

Aether also appears in genealogies attributed to the sixth-century BC logographer and mythographer Acusilaus. According to the Neoplatonist Damascius (c. early sixth century), Acusilaus said that Aether was, along with Eros and Metis, the offspring Erebus and Nyx. However, a scholion to Theocritus reports that, according to Acusilaus, Aether and Nyx were the parents of Eros.

Orphic

Aether played a significant role in Orphic cosmogony. There are a large number of ancient texts which have been called "Orphic", a few are extant, such as the Orphic Hymns, but most are not. Several important Orphic texts, which exist now only in fragments, have been called theogonies, since they contained material, similar to Hesiod's Theogony, which described the origin of the gods. At least three of these, the so called "Derveni Theogony",  the "Hieronyman Theogony",  and the "Rhapsodic Theogony" or Rhapsodies, contained references to Aether the personification as well as aether the material element.

Derveni Theogony
The oldest of these theogonies, the Derveni Theogony, is a text which is extensively quoted in the Derveni papyrus (fourth century BC), One of these quotes contains a reference to aether the material element:

Also possibly from the Derveni Theogony is the idea, from a fragment of Chrysippus (preserved in Philodemus, De Pietate (On Piety)), that "everywhere is aither, which itself is both father and son".

Hieronyman Theogony
The early 6th-century Neoplatonist Damascius, in his De principiis (On First Principles) comments on an Orphic text, which he describes as "under the names of Hieronymus and Hellanicus, if indeed this is not the same". This text is called the "Hieronyman Theogony" (second century BC). Damascius says that the Hieronyman Theogony had "serpent Time" as the father  of three offspring, "moist Aether", "limitless Chaos" and "misty Erebos".

Rhapsodic Theogony
Also in his De principiis, Damascius briefly summarizes the "standard Orphic theology" as found in another text, which he refers to as "these Orphic Rhapsodies currently circulating". According to Damascius, the Rhapsodies (first century BC/AD?), began with Chronus from which came two offspring, Aether and Chaos:

The 5th-century Greek Neoplatonist Proclus, in his Commentary on Plato's Republic, quotes the following verses from the Rhapsodies:

Here Chasm is another name for Chaos. In another passage from the De principiis, Damascius quotes other verses from the Rhapsodies:

 While Proclus, in his Commentary on Plato's Timaeus, describes the Orphic cosmic egg as "born from Aither and Chaos", and calls Phanes the "son of Aither". Proclus also says that, when Phanes hatched from the cosmic egg, Aether and Chasm were split.

Aether, the material element is also mentioned twice in a thirty-two line hymn-like passage to Zeus which was apparently part of the Rhapsodies in which various parts of the physical cosmos are associated with parts of Zeus' body. Line 8 lists things contained in Zeus' body:

while line 17 says:

Also possibly drawn from the Rhapsodies is an account of the creation of the world attributed to "Orpheus" by the sixth century AD chronographer John Malalas:

Another Orphic verse fragment, also possibly from the Rhapsodies, is quoted in the Etymologicum Magnum'''s entry on the name Phanes:

Hymn to Aether
The Orphic Hymns (3rd century AD?) are a collection of eighty-seven poems addressed to various deities or abstractions. The fifth Orphic Hymn was addressed to Aether:

See also
Anshar

Notes

References
 Aeschylus, Fragments, edited and translated by Alan H. Sommerstein, Loeb Classical Library No. 505. Cambridge, Massachusetts: Harvard University Press, 2009. . Online version at Harvard University Press.
 Athanassakis, Apostolos N., and Benjamin M. Wolkow, The Orphic Hymns, Johns Hopkins University Press, 2013) . Google Books.
 Bremmer, Jan N., Greek Religion and Culture, the Bible and the Ancient Near East, Jerusalem Studies in Religion and Culture, Brill, 2008. . .
 Callimachus, Musaeus, Aetia, Iambi, Hecale and Other Fragments, Hero and Leander, edited and translated by C. A. Trypanis, T. Gelzer, Cedric H. Whitman, Loeb Classical Library No. 421, Cambridge, Massachusetts, Harvard University Press, 1973. . Online version at Harvard University Press.
 Cicero, Marcus Tullius, De Natura Deorum in Cicero: On the Nature of the Gods. Academics, translated by H. Rackham, Loeb Classical Library No. 268, Cambridge, Massachusetts, Harvard University Press, first published 1933, revised 1951. . Online version at Harvard University Press.  Internet Archive.
 Fowler, R. L. (2000), Early Greek Mythography: Volume 1: Text and Introduction, Oxford University Press, 2000. .
 Fowler, R. L. (2013), Early Greek Mythography: Volume 2: Commentary, Oxford University Press, 2013. .
 Gantz, Timothy, Early Greek Myth: A Guide to Literary and Artistic Sources, Johns Hopkins University Press, 1996, Two volumes:  (Vol. 1),  (Vol. 2).
 Grimal, Pierre, The Dictionary of Classical Mythology, Wiley-Blackwell, 1996, .
 Hard, Robin, The Routledge Handbook of Greek Mythology: Based on H.J. Rose's "Handbook of Greek Mythology", Psychology Press, 2004, . Google Books.
 Hesiod, Theogony, in Hesiod, Theogony, Works and Days, Testimonia, Edited and translated by Glenn W. Most. Loeb Classical Library No. 57. Cambridge, Massachusetts, Harvard University Press, 2018. . Online version at Harvard University Press.
 Homer, The Iliad with an English Translation by A.T. Murray, Ph.D. in two volumes. Cambridge, Massachusetts, Harvard University Press; London, William Heinemann, Ltd. 1924. Online version at the Perseus Digital Library.
 Hyginus, Gaius Julius, Fabulae in Apollodorus' Library and Hyginus' Fabulae: Two Handbooks of Greek Mythology, Translated, with Introductions by R. Scott Smith and Stephen M. Trzaskoma, Hackett Publishing Company,  2007. .
 Hyginus, Fabulae from The Myths of Hyginus translated and edited by Mary Grant. University of Kansas Publications in Humanistic Studies. Online version at the Topos Text Project.
 Kern, Otto. Orphicorum Fragmenta, Berlin, 1922. Internet Archive.
 Malalas, John,  The Chronicle of John Malalas: A Translation, trans. Elizabeth Jefferys, Michael Jefferys and Roger Scott, Australian Association for Byzantine Studies, Melbourne, 1986. .
 Meisner, Dwayne A., Orphic Tradition and the Birth of the Gods, Oxford University Press, 2018. . Google Books. 
 Orphic Argonautica in Argonautica, Hymni Libellus de lapidibus et fragmenta cum notis, H. Stephani and A.C. Eschenbachii, Leipzig: Sumtibus Caspari Fritsch, 1764. Internet Archive.
 The Oxford Classical Dictionary, second edition,  Hammond, N.G.L. and Howard Hayes Scullard (editors), Oxford University Press, 1992. .
 Smith, William; Dictionary of Greek and Roman Biography and Mythology, London (1873). "Aether"
 Tripp, Edward, Crowell's Handbook of Classical Mythology, Thomas Y. Crowell Co; First edition (June 1970). .
 West, M. L. (1983), The Orphic Poems, Clarendon Press Oxford, 1983. .
 West, M. L. (2002), "'Eumelos': A Corinthian Epic Cycle?" in The Journal of Hellenic Studies, vol. 122, pp. 109–133. .
 West, M. L. (2003), Greek Epic Fragments: From the Seventh to the Fifth Centuries BC, edited and translated by Martin L. West, Loeb Classical Library No. 497, Cambridge, Massachusetts, Harvard University Press, 2003.  . Online version at Harvard University Press.
 White, Stephen, "Hieronymus of Rhodes: The Sources, Text and Translation" in Lyco of Troas and Hieronymus of Rhodes: Text, Translation, and Discussion'', Volume XII, editors: William Wall Fortenbaugh, Stephen Augustus White, Transaction Publishers, 2004. .

Sky and weather gods
Light gods
Greek gods
Greek primordial deities
Personifications in Greek mythology
Children of Nyx
Consorts of Gaia
Personifications